Kenneth Kent (20 April 1892 – 17 November 1963) was an English actor. He is most notable for his roles as Inspector Hanaud in the film At the Villa Rose (1940) and as Emperor Napoleon in the film Idol of Paris (1948).

Partial filmography
 Queer Cargo (1938) - Vibart
 Luck of the Navy (1938) - Col. Suvaroff
 At the Villa Rose (1940) - Inspector Hanaud
 Night Train to Munich (1940) - Controller 
 The House of the Arrow (1940) - Inspector Hanaud
 Dangerous Moonlight (1941) - Andre De Guise
 The Idol of Paris (1948) - Emperor Napoleon
 A Time to Kill (1955) - Dr. Cole (final film role)

References

External links

1892 births
1963 deaths
English male stage actors
English male film actors
Male actors from Liverpool
20th-century English male actors